Michel Dulud (11 January 1902 – 4 March 1997), was a French playwright, screenwriter and film director.

He passed his military pilot's license in 1936, and gave lectures on the beginnings of aeronautics, before becoming a playwright, performed in Paris (Théâtre Fontaine) and in New York. He also tried his hand at cinema as a screenwriter and directed two films.

Theater 
 1937: La nuit du 7 (premiered at Théâtre Français of New-York in February then at théâtre des Capucines de Paris in May)
 1939: Le Revenant (at Théâtre des capucines in February)
 1942: On demande (at Théâtre Antoine in June)
 1944: Monseigneur (at Théâtre Daunou in April)
 1947: Tous les deux (at Théâtre Antoine in March)
 1949: Deux coqs vivaient en paix (after a tale by La Fontaine, premiered at Théâtre Monceau in December)
 1952: Back Street (after Fannie Hurst, premiered at Brussels, then at Théâtre Fontaine in Paris, in April)
 1956: Les Inconsolables (at Théâtre du Vieux Colombier in April, with an act by Michel Dulud en lisant Maupassant)

Filmography 
 1946:  (script & direction)
 1949:  (adaptation & dialogues, based on the play Tous les deux)
 1950:  (script & direction, based on the play Monseigneur)
 1951:  (script & dialogues)
 1952:  
 1953:  Little Jacques (dialogues)
 1954: 
 1955:  (screenwriter)
 1959:  (script)

Bibliography 
 1953: La Famille Duraton - Published under the pseudonym "Saint-Marre"
 1958: Du Guesclin - Published under the pseudonym "Michel Dulud"

References

External links 
 
 

1902 births
1997 deaths
20th-century French dramatists and playwrights
French film directors
20th-century French screenwriters
Writers from Paris